Breakaway is the second solo album by English singer Kim Appleby, released in 1993 on Parlophone Records. It includes the singles "Light of the World", which reached number 41 in the UK Singles Chart, and "Breakaway", which reached number 56. The album only received a limited release and it failed to chart. It is Appleby's last studio album to date.

Track listing

References

External links
Breakaway at Discogs

1993 albums
Kim Appleby albums
Parlophone albums
Albums produced by Neil Davidge